In mathematics, and more precisely in semigroup theory, a nilsemigroup or nilpotent semigroup is a semigroup whose every element is nilpotent.

Definitions
Formally, a semigroup S is a nilsemigroup if:
S contains 0 and
for each element a∈S, there exists a positive integer k such that ak=0.

Finite nilsemigroups
Equivalent definitions exists for finite semigroup. A finite semigroup S is nilpotent if, equivalently:
 for each , where  is the cardinality of S.
The zero is the only idempotent of S.

Examples
The trivial semigroup of a single element is trivially a nilsemigroup.

The set of strictly upper triangular matrix, with matrix multiplication is nilpotent.

Let  a bounded interval  of positive real numbers. We now show that  is a nilsemigroup whose zero is n. This example generalize for any bounded interval of an Archimedean ordered semigroup.

Properties
A non-trivial nilsemigroup does not contain an identity element. It follows that the only nilpotent monoid is the trivial monoid.

The class of nilsemigroups is:
closed under taking subsemigroups
closed under taking quotients
closed under finite products
but is not closed under arbitrary direct product. Indeed, take the semigroup , where  is defined as above. The semigroup S is a direct product of nilsemigroups, however its contains no nilpotent element.

It follows that the class of nilsemigroups is not a variety of universal algebra. However, the set of finite nilsemigroups is a variety of finite semigroups. The variety of finite nilsemigroups is defined by the profinite equalities .

References

Semigroup theory